Nino Taranto (28 August 1907 – 23 February 1986) was an Italian film actor. He appeared in more than 80 films between 1924 and 1971.

Life and career
Born in Naples, Taranto started his career as a child actor in 1918 starring in some local stage companies.  After studying mime and dance he joined the company of Salvatore Cafiero. In 1928 he successfully entered into the sceneggiata genre: invited on tour in the United States, he returned with "a pianola tape and a thousand dollars",  used to finance his first company of variety, which lasted only fifteen days and ended in total disaster. In 1933 he debuted on dramatic theater and in revue, a genre he focused until the 1950s.

Taranto achieved large notoriety thanks to two  macchiette (i.e. comic musical monologues caricaturing stock characters), Ciccio Formaggio and Baron Carlo Mazza, two caricatural characters of proven success that he reprised several times during his career.

He debuted in cinema in 1938, but achieved some success just in the 1950s. In 1953 he won a Nastro d'Argento for Best Actor for his performance in Luigi Zampa's Anni facili. In the sixties he was several times sidekick of Totò in a number of successful comedies and starred in numerous musicarelli films.

Taranto also starred in a number of TV films, took part in several television and radio variety shows and recorded several songs. In 1985 RAI honored the artist with a monographic documentary series in  four parts, Taranto Story.

Filmography

 Vedi Napoli e poi muori (1924)
 Nonna Felicità (1938) - Nino Senesi
 A Lady Did It (1938) - Nino
 We Were Seven Widows (1939) - Orlando, il cameriere di bordo
 La canzone rubata (1940) - Alberto & il cantante Giacomo Albini
 Arcobaleno (1943)
 The Whole City Sings (1945) - Il maestro elementare
 Lo sciopero dei milioni (1947)
 Dove sta Zaza? (1947) - Il Napoletano e Il Americano
 Accidenti alla guerra!... (1948) - Michele Coniglio
 Baron Carlo Mazza (1948) - Barone Carlo Mazza
 Se fossi deputato (1949) - Angelino Angelini
 The Firemen of Viggiù (1949) - Himself
 I'm in the Revue (1950) - Pasquale - l'habilleur
 Cintura di castità (1950) - Il capocomico
 Tizio, Caio, Sempronio (1951) - Tizio
 Licenza premio (1951) - Domenico Errichiello
 Free Escape (1951) - Domenico Errichiello
 A Thief in Paradise (1952) - Vincenzo De Pretore
 The Piano Tuner Has Arrived (1952) - Achille Scozzella
 Easy Years (1953) - Prof. Luigi De Francesco
 Café chantant (1953) - Se stesso / Himself
 Of Life and Love (1954) - Bosco
 It Happened at the Police Station (1954) - Police Chief
 Milanese in Naples (1954) - Luigi Martiello
 Carousel of Variety (1955)
 La moglie è uguale per tutti (1955) - Avvocato Antonio De Papis
 Wives and Obscurities (1956) - Carmine Petriccone
 Arrivano i dollari! (1957) - Giuseppe Pasti
 Husbands in the City (1957) - Giuseppe Pasti
 Italia piccola (1957) - Vincenzo
 A sud niente di nuovo (1957)
 I prepotenti (1958)
 Mogli pericolose (1958) - Domenico Esposito
 Il bacio del sole (Don Vesuvio) (1958) - Raffaele Spada
 Mogli pericolose (1958) - Pirro
 Il terribile Teodoro (1958)
 Prepotenti più di prima (1959) - Domenico Esposito
 Avventura a Capri (1959) - Barone Vannutelli
 Ferdinando I, re di Napoli (1959) - The Prime Minister 'Tarantella'
 Caravan petrol (1960) - Ciro
 Totòtruffa 62 (1961) - Camillo
 Accroche-toi, y'a du vent! (1961) - Don Cicillo
 Pesci d'oro e bikini d'argento (1961)
 Che femmina!! E... che dollari! (1961)
 Toto vs. Maciste (1962) - Tarantakamen
 Lo smemorato di Collegno (1962) - Prof. Ademaro Gioberti
 Le massaggiatrici (1962) - Professor Gaspare Petroni
 I 4 monaci (1962) - Fra' Gaudenzio
 The Two Colonels (1963) - Sergente Quaglia
 Uno strano tipo (1963) - Cannarulo
 Totò contro i quattro (1963) - Giuseppe Mastrillo
 The Monk of Monza (1963) - Don Egidio, marchese de Lattanziis
 The Four Musketeers (1963)
 In ginocchio da te (1964) - Maresciallo Antonio Todisco
 Tears on Your Face (1964) - Giovanni Tudini
 Napoleone a Firenze (1964)
 Te lo leggo negli occhi (1965) - Gennaro
 Se non avessi più te (1965) - Ten. Antonio Todisco
 Non son degno di te (1965) - Antonio Todisco
 Dio, come ti amo! (1966) - Vincenzo Di Francesco
 Rita the Mosquito (1966) - Director of education
 Mi vedrai tornare (1966) - Nostromo Spampinato
 Perdono (1966) - Antonio Pezzullo
 Nessuno mi può giudicare (1966) - Antonio Pezzullo
 Stasera mi butto (1967) - Father of Marisa
 Nel sole (1967) - Physics Teacher
 Il ragazzo che sapeva amare (1967)
 L'oro del mondo (1968) - Filippo Pugliese
 Franco, Ciccio e le vedove allegre (1968) - Sacristan
 Chimera (1968) - José Da Costa
 Operazione ricchezza (1968)
 Il ragazzo che sorride (1969) - Filippo Leccisi
 Pensando a te (1969)
 Il suo nome è Donna Rosa (1969) - Antonio Belmonte
 Lisa dagli occhi blu (1970) - General
 Ninì Tirabusciò: la donna che inventò la mossa (1970) - Armando / Professor Vincelli
 Mezzanotte d'amore (1970) - Antonio
 Venga a fare il soldato da noi (1971) - Captain Re

Further reading
Andrea Jelardi, Nino Taranto. Vita straordinaria di un grande protagonista dello spettacolo italiano del Novecento, Kairòs, 2012, 
Giulio Baffi, Nino Taranto ha 100 anni, Guida, 2007, 
Renzo Arbore, Vittorio Marsiglia, Carlo Missaglia, Come Si Ride a Napoli!, Baldini Castoldi Dalai, 2010,

References

External links

1907 births
1986 deaths
Italian male film actors
Italian comedians
Nastro d'Argento winners
20th-century Italian male actors
20th-century Italian comedians